Shmidt is a surname. Notable people with the surname include:

Alexander Shmidt (1911–1987), Russian painter
Dmitry Shmidt (18961937), Red Army officer
Svitlana Shmidt (born 1990), Ukrainian middle-distance runner

See also
Shmidt Point, headland in Antarctica
Shmidt Subglacial Basin, subglacial basin in Antarctica